The following television stations operate on virtual channel 28 in the United States:

 K05NE-D in Polson, Montana
 K08AP-D in Pateros, Mansfield, Washington
 K08CY-D in Riverside, Washington
 K09UP-D in Colville, Washington
 K09ZA-D in Leavenworth, Washington
 K10DK-D in Malott Wakefield, Washington
 K10DL-D in Tonasket, Washington
 K11UN-D in Coolin, Idaho
 K11WY-D in Coulee City, Washington
 K13ER-D in Cashmere, Washington
 K16KZ-D in Quartz Creek, etc., Montana
 K16LV-D in Grays River, Washington
 K18LH-D in Lewiston, Idaho
 K18MP-D in Ridgecrest, California
 K18NJ-D in Bellingham, Washington
 K19AU-D in Omak, Okanogan, etc., Washington
 K20KQ-D in Livingston, etc., Montana
 K23OT-D in Juliaetta, Idaho
 K24IY-D in Raton, New Mexico
 K24LM-D in Bridgeport, Washington
 K25NY-D in Bridgeport, Washington
 K27LD-D in Salix, Iowa
 K27MT-D in Romeo, Colorado
 K27NC-D in Coeur D'Alene, Idaho
 K28DJ-D in Broken Bow, Oklahoma
 K28EB-D in Cortez, etc., Colorado
 K28FP-D in Astoria, Oregon
 K28GG-D in Medford, Oregon
 K28GY-D in Santa Barbara, etc., California
 K28HI-D in Breckenridge/Dillon, Colorado
 K28HS-D in Agana, Guam
 K28IF-D in Willmar, Minnesota
 K28KO-D in Sweetgrass, etc., Montana
 K28KU-D in Crested Butte, Colorado
 K28LE-D in Idaho Falls, Idaho
 K28LK-D in Silver City, New Mexico
 K28MH-D in Bend, Oregon
 K28NM-D in Carlsbad, New Mexico
 K28OG-D in Kalispell & Lakeside, Montana
 K28OH-D in St. James, Minnesota
 K28QF-D in Sherman, Texas
 K28QJ-D in Duluth, Minnesota
 K28QT-D in Dickinson, North Dakota
 K31AH-D in Omak, etc., Washington
 K31KL-D in Walla Walla, Washington
 K32LT-D in San Luis Obispo, California
 K33LW-D in Sandpoint, Idaho
 K34GI-D in Trinidad, Colorado
 K36PZ-D in Big Spring, Texas
 K46HZ-D in Bonners Ferry, Idaho
 K49KT-D in Bend, Oregon
 K51EF-D in Coolin, Idaho
 KAMC in Lubbock, Texas
 KAYU-TV in Spokane, Washington
 KBTC-TV in Tacoma, Washington
 KBVU in Eureka, California
 KCET in Los Angeles, California
 KCNZ-CD in San Francisco, California
 KDTV-CD in Santa Rosa, California
 KEAM-LD in Amarillo, Texas
 KEPB-TV in Eugene, Oregon
 KFXA in Cedar Rapids, Iowa
 KHPK-LD in De Soto, Texas
 KHPX-CD in Georgetown, Texas
 KJST-LD in McAllen, Texas
 KKPM-CD in Chico, California
 KLPD-LD in Denver, Colorado
 KNLD-LD in New Orleans, Louisiana
 KONV-LD in Canton, Ohio
 KORO in Corpus Christi, Texas
 KSAA-LD in San Antonio, Texas
 KSBK-LD in Colorado Springs, Colorado
 KSPK-LD in Walsenburg, Colorado
 KUGB-CD in Houston, Texas
 KVES-LD in Palm Springs, California
 KVPX-LD in Las Vegas, Nevada
 KWKD-LD in Wichita, Kansas
 KWVC-LD in Malaga, etc., Washington
 KWYB-LD in Bozeman, Montana
 KYLE-TV in Bryan, Texas
 KZKC-LD in Bakersfield, California
 W02CS-D in Ponce, Puerto Rico
 W19EN-D in River Falls, Wisconsin
 W23EV-D in Carrollton, Georgia
 W24CL-D in Grantsburg, Wisconsin
 W24EU-D in Erie, Pennsylvania
 W24EZ-D in Allingtown, Connecticut
 W28CJ-D in Manteo, North Carolina
 W28DY-D in Sault Ste. Marie, Michigan
 W28EX-D in Clarksburg, West Virginia
 W28FC-D in Roanoke, West Virginia
 W28FD-D in Greenville, Florida
 W28FG-D in Cleveland-Akron-Canton, Ohio
 W29EZ-D in Elmira, New York
 WBRE-TV in Wilkes-Barre, Pennsylvania
 WBUN-LD in Birmingham, Alabama
 WBWM-LD in Mt Pleasant, Michigan
 WCPB in Salisbury, Maryland
 WDWW-LD in Atlanta, Georgia
 WDYL-LD in Louisville, Kentucky
 WEZK-LD in Knoxville, Tennessee
 WFEF-LD in Orlando, Florida
 WFPA-CD in Philadelphia, Pennsylvania
 WFTS-TV in Tampa, Florida
 WGAT-LD in Augusta, Georgia
 WGFL in High Springs, Florida
 WGTB-CD in Charlotte, North Carolina
 WHWC-TV in Menomonie, Wisconsin
 WJSP-TV in Columbus, Georgia
 WLPC-CD in Redford, Michigan
 WLWC in New Bedford, Massachusetts
 WNPX-TV in Franklin, Tennessee
 WNYF-CD in Watertown, New York
 WNYJ-LD in New York, New York
 WNYP-LD in Port Jervis, New York
 WPGX in Panama City, Florida
 WRDC in Durham, North Carolina
 WRJT-LD in Wausau, Wisconsin
 WSJV in Elkhart, Indiana
 WTGS in Hardeeville, South Carolina
 WTTE in Columbus, Ohio
 WUDX-LD in Tuscaloosa, Alabama
 WUDZ-LD in Terre Haute, Indiana
 WVER in Rutland, Vermont
 WWBH-LD in Mobile, Alabama
 WWBK-LD in Richmond, Virginia
 WWNY-CD in Massena, New York
 WWYA-LD in Honea Path, South Carolina
 WYMI-LD in Summerland Key, Florida

The following stations, which are no longer licensed, formerly operated on virtual channel 28 in the United States:
 K28LA-D in Yreka, California
 K28LC-D in Redding, California
 K32NP-D in Billings, Montana
 WAZF-CD in Front Royal, Virginia
 WCMZ-TV in Flint, Michigan
 WQVC-CD in Greensburg, Pennsylvania
 WVTX-CD in Bridgeport, Ohio

References

28 virtual